Gagarin's Start  (Gagarinskiy start), also known as  Baikonur Site 1 or Site 1/5 is a launch site at Baikonur Cosmodrome in Kazakhstan that was used for the Soviet space program and is now managed by Roscosmos.

Overview
The launchpad for the world's first human spaceflight made by Yuri Gagarin on Vostok 1 in 1961, the site was referred to as Site No.1 (Ploshchadka No. 1) as the first one of its kind. It is also sometimes referred to as NIIP-5 LC1, Baikonur LC1, LC-1/5, LC-1 or GIK-5 LC1.

On 17 March 1954, the Council of Ministers ordered several ministries to select a site for a proving ground to test the R-7 rocket by 1 January 1955. A special reconnaissance commission considered several possible geographic regions and selected Tyuratam in the Kazakh SSR. This selection was approved on 12 February 1955 by the Council of Ministers, with a completion of construction targeted for 1958. Work on the construction of Site No.1 began on 20 July 1955 by military engineers. Day and night more than 60 powerful trucks worked at the site;  of earth were excavated and removed per day, with the total volume estimated to be . During winter explosives were widely utilised. By the end of October 1956, all primary buildings and installation of infrastructure for R-7 tests were completed. The Installation and Testing Building (Montazhno-ispytatel'nyj korpus) named "Site No.2" was built and a special railway completed from there to Site No.1 where the launch pad for the rocket was located. By April 1957, all remaining work was completed and the site was ready for launches.

The R-7 missile made its maiden voyage from LC-1 on 15 May 1957. On 4 October 1957, the pad was used to launch the world's first artificial satellite, Sputnik 1. Crewed spaceflights launched from the site include Yuri Gagarin's flight, Valentina Tereshkova's flight, and numerous other human spaceflight missions, including all Soviet and Russian crewed spaceflights to Mir. The pad was also used to launch Luna program spacecraft, Mars probe program spacecraft, Venera program spacecraft, many Cosmos satellites and others. From 1957 through 1966 the site hosted ready-to-launch strategic nuclear ICBMs in addition to spacecraft launches; by the 2000s there were more than 400 launches from the site. The 500th launch from this site was of Soyuz TMA-18M on 2 September 2015.

In 1961, the growing launch schedule of the Soviet space program resulted in the opening of a sister pad at Baikonur, LC-31/6. LC-1 has been the primary facility for human spaceflight launches, with occasional Soyuz flights from LC-31/6. LC-1 was damaged several times by booster explosions during the early years.

As of 2016, the most recent accident to occur on or around the pad was the attempted launch of Soyuz T-10-1 in September 1983, which ended disastrously when the booster caught fire during prelaunch preparations and exploded, causing severe damage that left LC-1 inoperable for almost a year.

In 2019, Gagarin's Start hosted its last two crewed launches in July and September before its planned modernisation for Soyuz-2 rockets with a planned first launch at 2023. In place of Gagarin's Start, crewed missions will use the new Soyuz-2 rocket which is launched from Site 31. The first crewed mission from Site 31 since 2012 was Soyuz MS-16 on 9 April 2020.

The last flight from Gagarin's Start was the Soyuz MS-15 flight to ISS, launched 25 September 2019.

Gallery

See also
 Baikonur Cosmodrome Site 31
 Cape Canaveral Launch Complex 14, the equivalent for the United States' first human spaceflights

Notes

Further reading 
 J. K. Golovanov, M., "Korolev: Facts and myths", Nauka, 1994, 
 "Rockets and people" – B. E. Chertok, M: "mechanical engineering", 1999.  
 «A breakthrough in space» - Konstantin Vasilyevich Gerchik, M: LLC "Veles", 1994, - 
 "Testing of rocket and space technology - the business of my life" Events and facts - A.I. Ostashev, Korolyov, 2001.
 "Baikonur. Korolev. Yangel." - M. I. Kuznetsk, Voronezh: IPF "Voronezh", 1997, 
 "Look back and look ahead. Notes of a military engineer" - Rjazhsky A. A., 2004, SC. first, the publishing house of the "Heroes of the Fatherland" 
 "Rocket and space feat Baikonur" - Vladimir Порошков, the "Patriot" publishers 2007. 
 "Unknown Baikonur" - edited by B. I. Posysaeva, M.: "globe", 2001. 
 "Bank of the Universe" - edited by Boltenko A. C., Kyiv, 2014., publishing house "Phoenix", 

Baikonur Cosmodrome
Start